Aleksander Ossipov (26 August 1890 – 21 December 1941 Kirov, Russia) was an Estonian politician. He was a member of V Riigikogu.

References

1890 births
1941 deaths
Members of the Riigikogu, 1932–1934
Members of the Estonian National Assembly
Members of the Riigivolikogu